The Society for Medieval and Renaissance Philosophy is a learned society established in 1978 to support teaching and research relating to medieval and renaissance philosophy. Presidents of the society have included Arthur Hyman, Marilyn Adams, James Ross, Jorge Gracia, Mary Clark, and R. James Long.

Presidents

 1977–1980 Arthur Hyman
 1981–1982 Marilyn McCord Adams
 1983–1984 John F. Wippel
 1985–1986 James Ross
 1987–1988 Edward Mahoney
 1989–1990 Stephen Brown
 1991–1992 Jorge J. E. Gracia
 1993–1994 Mary T. Clark
 1995–1996 Alfred Ivry
 1997–1998 Paul V. Spade
 1999–2000 A. Stephen McGrade
 2001–2002 Therese-Anne Druart
 2003–2004 Steven P. Marrone
 2005–2006 R. James Long
 2007–2008 Gordon Wilson
 2009–2010 Helen S. Lang
 2011–2012 Timothy Noone
 2013–2014 Richard Taylor
 2015–2016 Eileen Sweeney
 2017 Bonnie Kent
 2018–? Tamar Rudavsky
 Therese Cory

References

External links
 

1978 establishments in the United States
Medieval philosophy
Organizations established in 1978
Philosophical societies in the United States
Renaissance philosophy